Dhayanatray (1676-1726) was an Indian writer who wrote on Jainism.

Life
Dhyanatray was born in 1676. He died in 1726.

Works
Dhayanatray translated Svayambhustotra in Agra,  which is a fifth-century CE Sanskrit adoration of the twenty-four tirthankaras written by Samantabhadra in 143 verses.

References

Citations

Sources
 
 
 
 

Indian writers
1676 births
1726 deaths